Shayne Breuer (born 10 September 1972) is a former Australian rules footballer in the Australian Football League (AFL). He is notable for kicking Port Adelaide's first goal in the AFL.

AFL career

Geelong (1994–1996)
Breuer started at Geelong and played every game in Geelong's AFL Grand Final years of 1994 and 1995, having 50 games on the board after only two seasons. He was a magnificent on-baller whose best year was in 1995 where he also booted 40 goals (career high five goals in the qualifying final against Footscray).

Port Adelaide (1997–1999)
After a solid year in 1996, Breuer went on to play on with Port Adelaide in their inaugural year in 1997 where he kicked 17 goals and played 21 games. But after the 1997 season he struggled to get a spot in the team. He played three seasons with the Power before getting de-listed at the end of the 1999 season. 
 
Breuer is mostly remembered by Port Adelaide fans for kicking Port Adelaide's first goal in the AFL.

Coaching career
Breuer had also coached Kalkee in the Horsham district league. After coaching Kalkee, he took on the coaching role at Horsham Saints Football Netball Club where he led the club to back-to-back senior premierships

Current status
Breuer played in the 2009 West End Slowdown. He has now retired from Kalkee and owns and manages sporting goods store Intersport in Horsham.

External links

Geelong Football Club players
Port Adelaide Football Club players
Port Adelaide Football Club players (all competitions)
Woodville-West Torrens Football Club players
Australian rules footballers from South Australia
Living people
1972 births